Trilby is a 1914 British silent drama film directed by Harold M. Shaw and starring Herbert Beerbohm Tree, Viva Birkett, and Charles Rock. It is based on Tree's 1895 stage production of Trilby, itself an adaptation of the 1894 novel of the same name by George du Maurier.

Premise
Trilby, a young singer, falls under the dominance of Svengali.

Cast
 Herbert Beerbohm Tree – Svengali
 Viva Birkett – Trilby O'Farrell
 Charles Rock – Sandy McAllister
 Ion Swinley – Little Billee
 Philip Merivale – Taffy Wynne
 Wyndham Guise – Mr O'Ferrall
 Cicely Richards – Madame Vinard
 Douglas Munro – Reverend Bagot

References

External links

1914 films
1914 drama films
1910s English-language films
Films directed by Harold M. Shaw
Films based on British novels
Films based on works by George du Maurier
British silent feature films
British drama films
Trilby (novel)
British films based on plays
British black-and-white films
1910s British films
Silent drama films